Beeswax (cera alba) is a natural wax produced by honey bees of the genus Apis.  The wax is formed into scales by eight wax-producing glands in the abdominal segments of worker bees, which discard it in or at the hive.  The hive workers collect and use it to form cells for honey storage and larval and pupal protection within the beehive.  Chemically, beeswax consists mainly of esters of fatty acids and various long-chain alcohols.

Beeswax has been used since prehistory as the first plastic, as a lubricant and waterproofing agent, in lost wax casting of metals and glass, as a polish for wood and leather, for making candles, as an ingredient in cosmetics and as an artistic medium in encaustic painting.

Beeswax is edible, having similarly negligible toxicity to plant waxes, and is approved for food use in most countries and in the European Union under the E number E901.

Production
The beeswax is formed by worker bees, which secrete it from eight wax-producing mirror glands on the inner sides of the sternites (the ventral shield or plate of each segment of the body) on abdominal segments 4 to 7. The sizes of these wax glands depend on the age of the worker, and after many daily flights, these glands gradually begin to atrophy.

The new wax is initially glass-clear and colorless, becoming opaque after chewing and being contaminated with pollen by the hive worker bees, becoming progressively yellower or browner by incorporation of pollen oils and propolis. Worker bees use the beeswax to build honeycomb cells. For the wax-making bees to secrete wax, the ambient temperature in the hive must be .

The book Beeswax Production, Harvesting, Processing and Products suggests  of beeswax is sufficient to store  of honey. Another study estimated that  of wax can store  of honey.

Sugars from honey are metabolized in wax-gland-associated fat cells into beeswax. The amount of honey used by bees to produce wax has not been accurately determined, but according to Whitcomb's 1946 experiment,  of honey yields  of wax.

Processing

Beeswax as a product for human use may come from cappings cut off the cells in the process of extraction, from old comb that is scrapped, or from unwanted burr comb and brace comb removed from a hive. Its color varies from nearly white to brownish, but most often is a shade of yellow, depending on purity, the region, and the type of flowers gathered by the bees. The wax from the brood comb of the honey bee hive tends to be darker than wax from the honeycomb because impurities accumulate more quickly in the brood comb. Due to the impurities, the wax must be rendered before further use. The leftovers are called slumgum, and is derived from old breeding rubbish (pupa casings, cocoons, shed larva skins, etc.), bee droppings, propolis, and general rubbish.

The wax may be clarified further by heating in water. As with petroleum waxes, it may be softened by dilution with mineral oil or vegetable oil to make it more workable at room temperature.

Physical characteristics

Beeswax is a fragrant solid at room temperature. The colors are light yellow, medium yellow, or dark brown and white. Beeswax is a tough wax formed from a mixture of several chemical compounds.

Beeswax has a relatively low melting point range of 62 to 64 °C (144 to 147 °F). If beeswax is heated above 85 °C (185 °F) discoloration occurs. The flash point of beeswax is 204.4 °C (400 °F).

When natural beeswax is cold, it is brittle, and its fracture is dry and granular. At room temperature (conventionally taken as about 20 °C (68 °F)), it is tenacious and it softens further at human body temperature (37 °C (99 °F)).

Chemical composition 
An approximate chemical formula for beeswax is C15H31COOC30H61. Its main constituents are palmitate, palmitoleate, and oleate esters of long-chain (30–32 carbons) aliphatic alcohols, with the ratio of triacontanyl palmitate CH3(CH2)29O-CO-(CH2)14CH3 to cerotic acid CH3(CH2)24COOH, the two principal constituents, being 6:1. Beeswax can be classified generally into European and Oriental types. The saponification value is lower (3–5) for European beeswax, and higher (8–9) for Oriental types. The analytical characterization can be done by high-temperature gas chromatography.

Production
In 2020, world production of beeswax was 62,116 tonnes, led by India with 38% of the total.

Uses
Candle-making has long involved the use of beeswax, which burns readily and cleanly, and this material was traditionally prescribed for the making of the Paschal candle or "Easter candle". Beeswax candles are purported to be superior to other wax candles, because they burn brighter and longer, do not bend, and burn cleaner. It is further recommended for the making of other candles used in the liturgy of the Roman Catholic Church.  Beeswax is also the candle constituent of choice in the Eastern Orthodox Church.

Refined beeswax plays a prominent role in art materials both as a binder in encaustic paint and as a stabilizer in oil paint to add body.

Beeswax is an ingredient in surgical bone wax, which is used during surgery to control bleeding from bone surfaces; shoe polish and furniture polish can both use beeswax as a component, dissolved in turpentine or sometimes blended with linseed oil or tung oil; modeling waxes can also use beeswax as a component; pure beeswax can also be used as an organic surfboard wax. Beeswax blended with pine rosin is used for waxing, and can serve as an adhesive to attach reed plates to the structure inside a squeezebox. It can also be used to make Cutler's resin, an adhesive used to glue handles onto cutlery knives. It is used in Eastern Europe in egg decoration; it is used for writing, via resist dyeing, on batik eggs (as in pysanky) and for making beaded eggs.
Beeswax is used by percussionists to make a surface on tambourines for thumb rolls. It can also be used as a metal injection moulding binder component along with other polymeric binder materials.

Beeswax was formerly used in the manufacture of phonograph cylinders. It may still be used to seal formal legal or royal decree and academic parchments such as placing an awarding stamp imprimatur of the university upon completion of postgraduate degrees.

Purified and bleached beeswax is used in the production of food, cosmetics, and pharmaceuticals. The three main types of beeswax products are yellow, white, and beeswax absolute. Yellow beeswax is the crude product obtained from the honeycomb, white beeswax is bleached or filtered yellow beeswax, and beeswax absolute is yellow beeswax treated with alcohol. In food preparation, it is used as a coating for cheese; by sealing out the air, protection is given against spoilage (mold growth). Beeswax may also be used as a food additive E901, in small quantities acting as a glazing agent, which serves to prevent water loss, or used to provide surface protection for some fruits. Soft gelatin capsules and tablet coatings may also use E901. Beeswax is also a common ingredient of natural chewing gum. The wax monoesters in beeswax are poorly hydrolysed in the guts of humans and other mammals, so they have insignificant nutritional value. Some birds, such as honeyguides, can digest beeswax. Beeswax is the main diet of wax moth larvae.

The use of beeswax in skin care and cosmetics has been increasing. A German study found beeswax to be superior to similar barrier creams (usually mineral oil-based creams such as petroleum jelly), when used according to its protocol.
Beeswax is used in lip balm, lip gloss, hand creams, salves, and moisturizers; and in cosmetics such as eye shadow, blush, and eye liner. Beeswax is also an important ingredient in moustache wax and hair pomades, which make hair look sleek and shiny.

In oil spill control, beeswax is processed to create Petroleum Remediation Product (PRP). It is used to absorb oil or petroleum-based pollutants from water.

Historical uses

Beeswax was among the first plastics to be used, alongside other natural polymers such as gutta-percha, horn, tortoiseshell, and shellac. For thousands of years, beeswax has had a wide variety of applications; it has been found in the tombs of Egypt, in wrecked Viking ships, and in Roman ruins. Beeswax never goes bad and can be heated and reused. Historically, it has been used:

 As candles - the oldest intact beeswax candles north of the Alps were found in the Alamannic graveyard of Oberflacht, Germany, dating to 6th/7th century AD
 In the manufacture of cosmetics
 As a modelling material in the lost-wax casting process, or cire perdue
 For wax tablets used for a variety of writing purposes
 In encaustic paintings such as the Fayum mummy portraits
 In bow making
 To strengthen and preserve sewing thread, cordage, shoe laces, etc.
 As a component of sealing wax
 To strengthen and to forestall splitting and cracking of wind instrument reeds 
 To form the mouthpieces of a didgeridoo, and the frets on the Philippine kutiyapi – a type of boat lute
 As a sealant or lubricant for bullets in cap and ball firearms
 To stabilize the military explosive Torpex – before being replaced by a petroleum-based product
 In producing Javanese batik
 As an ancient form of dental tooth filling
 As the joint filler in the slate bed of pool and billiard tables.

See also 
 Carnauba wax
 Candelilla wax
 Paraffin wax
 Ozokerite (ceresin)
 Spermaceti

References

External links

The chemistry of bees Joel Loveridge, School of Chemistry, University of Bristol, accessed November 2005

Bee products
Animal glandular products
Waxes
Biodegradable materials
Sewing equipment
Articles containing video clips
E-number additives